{{Automatic taxobox
| image = Tentyria rotundata mittrei Solier, 1834 (3819947451).jpg
| image_caption = Tentyria rotundata mittrei
| taxon = Tentyria
| authority = Latreille, 1802
| synonyms = Heliodromus Brullé, 1832
}}Tentyria'' is a genus of beetles in the family Tenebrionidae, first scientifically documented by Pierre André Latreille in 1802.

List of species

References

Pimeliinae
Tenebrionidae genera